The women's K-1 500 metres event was an individual kayaking event conducted as part of the Canoeing at the 1980 Summer Olympics program.

Medalists

Results

Heats
Thirteen competitors entered in two heats on July 30, but two withdrew. The top three finishers from each of the heats advanced directly to the final while the rest competed in the semifinal.

Semifinal
The top three finishers in the semifinal (raced on August 1) advanced to the final.

Final
The final was held on August 1.

References
1980 Summer Olympics official report Volume 3. p. 195. 
Sports-reference.com 1980 women's K-1 500 m results.

Women's K-1 500
Olympic
Women's events at the 1980 Summer Olympics